The Myth may refer to:

The Myth (film), a 2005 Hong Kong film
The Myth (1986 film), a 1986 film directed by Michael Mileham
The Myth (TV series), a 2010 Chinese TV series based on the 2005 film
Nickname of Cuban bodybuilder Sergio Oliva
The Myth (band), a Maltese rock band
The Myth (short film), a 1967 short fiction film directed by Adoor Gopalakrishnan

See also
Myth (disambiguation)